TeleCuraçao (Call sign: PJC-TV) is a television station that broadcasts in analog on NTSC channel 8 in Curaçao, with a repeater in Bonaire on channel 16.  The station was founded on July 31, 1960, as the Netherlands Antilles' first television station.  American broadcaster Gerald Bartell founded the station with the assistance of the local government, and assisted Telearuba in starting up later on.  At one point, the station had expanded across the remaining ABC islands with repeaters (such as on Aruba).

Initially, the station aired mostly American series (such as Gunsmoke), with local news, but gradually began producing more and more of its own programming, to rely less on American imports, and cater more to local tastes.

As part of Curaçao's digital television transition in 2013, TeleCuraçao added a digital simulcast on UHF 26 in DVB-T, with two additional subchannels.

See also
List of Caribbean television channels
Nos Pais Television
Telearuba
RTV-7

References

External links

Television stations in Aruba
Television stations in Bonaire
Television stations in Curaçao
Television channels and stations established in 1960
1960 establishments in the Netherlands Antilles